Carloni is an Italian surname. Notable people with the surname include:

Alessandro Carloni (born 1978), American animator
Ester Carloni (1897–1998), Italian actress
Giancarlo Carloni (born 1947), Italian footballer
Ida Carloni Talli (1860–1940), Italian actress
Mario Carloni (1894–1962), Italian soldier
Pietro Carloni (1896–1968), Italian actor

See also

Carlini (name)
Carlon

Italian-language surnames
Patronymic surnames
Surnames from given names